Ryan Stewart Gauld (born 16 December 1995) is a Scottish professional footballer who plays as an attacking midfielder for Major League Soccer club Vancouver Whitecaps FC.

He began his professional career at Dundee United, where he helped them reach the 2014 Scottish Cup Final, and his abilities on the ball earned comparisons to Lionel Messi from the Scottish media. In July 2014, he transferred to Portuguese club Sporting CP for a fee of around £3 million. Gauld mainly appeared for the club's B team, and was also loaned to Vitória de Setúbal, Aves, Farense and Hibernian. In July 2019, Gauld moved to Farense on a permanent basis. In July 2021, he signed for MLS club Vancouver Whitecaps FC, where he won the Canadian Championship in 2022.

Gauld has represented Scotland at under-19 and under-21 levels. He was called up to the senior squad for the first time in September 2014.

Early life
Gauld grew up in Laurencekirk, Aberdeenshire, where he attended Laurencekirk Primary before becoming a pupil at Mearns Academy.

In 2002, Gauld began to play for Brechin City Boys Club (now renamed Brechin City Youths), where he was part of a successful team alongside John Souttar and Euan Spark. The trio also developed their skills at coaching schools run in Dundee by Ian Cathro, before they all joined Dundee United's youth system in 2006 at the age of nine.

Club career

Dundee United

Gauld made his Scottish Premier League debut as a 16-year-old, as an 87th-minute substitute for Johnny Russell in the final match of the 2011–12 season, a 2–0 win away to Motherwell on 13 May.

On 24 January 2013, Gauld signed an extended contract keeping him at the club until January 2016. Later on in the 2012–13 season, on 1 April, he made his first start against St Johnstone at McDiarmid Park and marked the occasion with his first senior goal to open a game which ended 1–1.

On 4 November 2013, during the 2013–14 season, Gauld's contract was further extended, to run until May 2016. Five days later, he scored twice in a 4–0 win against Motherwell at Fir Park. On 15 December 2013, the Daily Record reported that Manchester United's Scottish manager David Moyes wanted to personally "scout" Gauld, and take the opportunity to run the rule over the potential of other young Dundee United players such as defenders John Souttar and Andrew Robertson. However, the following day, also his 18th birthday, Gauld's contract was further extended until May 2017. Around the same time, he was being tracked by English Premier League pair Everton and Liverpool, Italy's A.S. Roma and Spain's Real Madrid.

On 12 April 2014, Gauld played in the Scottish Cup semi-final at Ibrox, as United defeated Rangers 3–1 to advance to the Final. He made the run into the penalty area from which Stuart Armstrong scored the opening goal, and assisted the second from Gary Mackay-Steven. Five days later, he was shortlisted for the PFA Scotland Young Player of the Year award, which was eventually awarded to his teammate Robertson. In the Cup Final on 17 May, Gauld replaced Mackay-Steven for the final 26 minutes as Dundee United lost 2–0 to St Johnstone at Celtic Park. Gauld's season ended with eight goals in 38 games across all competitions, of which six were scored in his 31 league matches.

Sporting Clube de Portugal
On 2 July 2014, Sporting Clube de Portugal announced the signing of Gauld from Dundee United, for an undisclosed fee rumoured to be in the region of £3 million. He signed a six-year contract with a €60 million buy-out clause. He credited Sporting's track record of developing players such as Luís Figo, Cristiano Ronaldo and Nani for his decision to join them. Despite being put into the club's B-team, Gauld was named in the 25-man squad to play in the UEFA Champions League after impressing manager Marco Silva during training sessions.

He made his debut for Sporting B on 10 August 2014, replacing Palhinha at half time in a 1–0 defeat away to Farense. Seventeen days later, in his fourth match for the club, he scored for the first time, netting the second in a 3–0 home victory over Desportivo Aves. On 7 December, he scored a second goal, opening a 4–3 win at Lisbon neighbours Clube Oriental de Lisboa with a 20-yard volley. On 21 December, he was sent off for two bookings in a 3–1 triumph at Vitória de Guimarães B. He finished the season with three goals from 26 games for the B-team, the third coming on 7 February 2015, when he equalised as the team came from behind to win 2–1 against SC Olhanense.

Gauld made his debut for the first team on 29 December 2014 in a Taça da Liga game against Vitória S.C., playing the full 90 minutes in a 2–0 win. On his second start for the Sporting first team on 14 January 2015, Gauld was named man of the match in a 1–0 win in the same competition, against Boavista. Having been fouled by goalkeeper Daniel Monllor, he won the penalty converted by Junya Tanaka for the only goal. Four days later, he made his Primeira Liga debut, replacing André Martins for the last 25 minutes of a 4–2 win over Rio Ave at the Estádio José Alvalade. Gauld scored twice for the first team in a 3–2 defeat away to neighbours Belenenses in a Taça da Liga group game on 21 January.

In his second season in the Portuguese capital, Gauld scored his first goal of the B-team's campaign on 26 August 2015, the only one of the away match at S.C. Covilhã in the 84th minute. He followed this on 12 September with a strike in a 4–0 triumph at Oriental. Gauld matched his goal tally in Segunda Liga from the previous season on 3 October, when he opened a 1–1 draw at FC Famalicão, and succeeded it on 28 November with his fourth goal of the campaign, assuring the same result at Gil Vicente F.C.

Loans
On 20 July 2016, amidst interest from England's Sheffield Wednesday, Gauld was loaned to Portuguese top-flight team Vitória de Setúbal for the upcoming season, alongside his teammate André Geraldes. He made his debut for Vitória on 26 October 2016 in a Taça da Liga tie against lower-league Santa Clara, playing the full 90 minutes in a 2–0 win. He made his league debut three days later, coming on as a late substitute for Nenê Bonilha in a scoreless draw at home to FC Porto, his first game in Primeira Liga for 20 months.

On 5 January 2017, it was reported that Gauld had been recalled from loan to train with Sporting CP B, due to Sporting CP being eliminated from the Taça da Liga by Vitória in controversial circumstances. He played nine second-tier games for the B-team over the rest of the season, and was sent off on 14 May at the end of a 2–1 home loss to Académica de Coimbra.

On 24 July 2017, Gauld was loaned to Primeira Liga newcomers C.D. Aves. He was unable to play against his parent team on the first day of the season, however, he came on as an added-time substitute for Salvador Agra in the next game, a 2–2 draw with Paços de Ferreira on 13 August. In his fourth match on 11 September, he scored his first goal in Portugal's top flight, the winner in a 2–1 home win over Belenenses.

On 31 August 2018, Gauld joined LigaPro side Farense on a season-long loan. The loan to Farense was curtailed in January 2019 and he was then loaned to Scottish Premiership club Hibernian. Gauld suffered a hamstring injury and consequently only collected 371 minutes of game time from six first team games in his half season loan at Hibernian.

Farense
Gauld left Sporting to rejoin Farense on a permanent basis in July 2019, signing a two-year contract with an option for a third year and a €4 million release clause. On 29 February 2020, he scored his first career hat-trick in a 3–1 win over Académico de Viseu to put his team top of the second division; this concluded a run of six goals from seven games. Farense were granted promotion to the first division following the stoppage of the Portuguese second tier due to the COVID-19 pandemic. Gauld finished the season as the team's top scorer and was voted as the top player in the Portuguese second tier.

Vancouver Whitecaps FC
On 31 July 2021, Gauld signed with Major League Soccer side Vancouver Whitecaps FC on a three-and-a-half-year deal. He scored his first goal for the Whitecaps on 21 August 2021 against Los Angeles FC, an 89th-minute winner. In July 2022, he helped the Whitecaps win the Canadian Championship and was awarded the George Gross Memorial Trophy as the tournament's MVP.

International career
Gauld was capped 10 times for Scotland at under-19 level, scoring two goals. He made his debut on 9 October 2012 against Armenia, replacing Matty Kennedy after 66 minutes of an eventual 4–0 win in a European qualifier at New Douglas Park in Hamilton. He scored his first goal on his fourth cap on 3 September 2013, against Iceland at the Forthbank Stadium in Stirling,  a 20-yard free kick to equalise in a 1–1 draw.

Gauld scored two goals in 11 appearances for the under-21 team. On 6 November 2013, he was called into the under-21 squad for the first time, for the match against Georgia later that month. He scored his first goals for the under-21 team on his third cap on 8 September 2014, a brace in a 3–0 win away to Luxembourg at the Stade Municipal de Differdange, at the end of a failed European qualification campaign. On 30 September 2014, Gauld was called up to the senior Scotland national football team for Euro 2016 Group D qualifying matches against Georgia and Poland, but did not play. On 10 October 2015, Gauld was sent off for a foul on Marcus Coco in a 2–1 2017 UEFA European Under-21 Championship qualification loss to France at Pittodrie in his hometown.

Style of play

Gauld's ability on the ball, and his small and slight stature, led him to be compared to Lionel Messi, a comparison made by the British press since 2013. At Dundee United, he was tutored by Ian Cathro, who favoured creativity and passing over the physicality often expected in Scottish football. After his transfer to Sporting, BBC Sport columnist Richard Wilson predicted that Gauld would be better suited to the style of football in Portugal, due to its slower tempo and its concentration on a passing game. Gauld himself has spoken of his preference for Portuguese football over its Scottish equivalent, and expressed relief at the lower media interest in him at Sporting, opining that comparisons with Messi were exaggerated and premature.

Career statistics

Honours
Aves
 Taça de Portugal: 2017–18

Vancouver Whitecaps
Canadian Championship: 2022

Individual
George Gross Memorial Trophy: 2022

References

External links
 
 
 Generation Next profile at Just Football

Living people
Scottish footballers
1995 births
People educated at Mearns Academy
Footballers from Aberdeenshire
Association football midfielders
Scottish Premier League players
Scottish Professional Football League players
Dundee United F.C. players
Scotland youth international footballers
Scotland under-21 international footballers
Scottish expatriate sportspeople in Portugal
Scottish expatriate footballers
Expatriate footballers in Portugal
Scottish expatriate sportspeople in Canada
Expatriate soccer players in Canada
Sporting CP footballers
Sporting CP B players
Vitória F.C. players
C.D. Aves players
S.C. Farense players
Primeira Liga players
Liga Portugal 2 players
Hibernian F.C. players
Vancouver Whitecaps FC players
Designated Players (MLS)
Major League Soccer players